Jérôme Sina (born 18 February 1989) is a Zaïre-born, Rwandan football midfielder who plays for Bugesera.

References

1989 births
Living people
Rwandan footballers
Rwanda international footballers
Rayon Sports F.C. players
FC Saint-Éloi Lupopo players
Police F.C. (Rwanda) players
SC Villa players
Daring Club Motema Pembe players
Vital'O F.C. players
Namungo F.C. players
Bugesera FC players
Association football midfielders
Rwandan expatriate footballers
Expatriate footballers in Uganda
Rwandan expatriate sportspeople in Uganda
Expatriate footballers in Ethiopia
Rwandan expatriate sportspeople in Ethiopia
Expatriate footballers in Burundi
Rwandan expatriate sportspeople in Burundi
Expatriate footballers in Tanzania
Rwandan expatriate sportspeople in Tanzania
Tanzanian Premier League players